Akhil Niyogi also known as Swapanburo (25 October 1902 — 21 February 1993) was a Bengali children's writer and editor. He is better known by the pseudonym Swapnaburo.

Early life
He was born in 1902 at Sankrail-Tangail village of Mymensingh district, now Bangladesh. Niyogi's father's name is Govinda Chandra Niyogi and mother is Bhavatarini Devi. His father was a headmaster of Bindubasini High School at Tangail. He Passed Matriculation from Scottish Church Collegiate School and ISC from City College. Later he got admission in Government College of Art & Craft.

Career
While studying at Government Art College his novel 'Beporoya' was published serially in Shisusathi magazine. While a student at the Art College, he was the founder-editor of the Artist Welfare Society. A magazine called Chitra was published on behalf of the society. Niyogi started his career as a commercial artist later he was seen in the roles of lyricist, director, actor etc. He was the screenwriter of the documentary on Sriniketan produced by the West Bengal government during Rabindranath's lifetime. He directed the film Muktir Bandhan. Since 1945 onward, he was a regular contributor of the Jugantar magazine. He used to write songs for children under the pseudonym 'Swapnaburo' and gradually became popular by this name. He went to Vienna in 1952 at the invitation of the International Committee of the Red Cross. Netaji's wife and daughter were first mentioned in his book Sat Samudra Tero Nadir Pare. In 1988, the Government of West Bengal honored him with the Vidyasagar Award.

Published Books
Babuibasa Boarding
Banpalashir Khude Dakat
Bastuhara
Panka Theke Padma Jage
Dhanni Chele
Kishore Abhijan
Pala Parban Chara-chanda
Bhuture Desh
Khelar Sathi

Death
Akhil Niyogi died on 21 February 1993 in Calcutta.

See also
Ashapoorna Devi
Premendra Mitra
Leela Majumdar
Khagendranath Mitra
Dhirendralal Dhar

References

External links
 Milansagar - akhil_niyogil

1902 births
1993 deaths
Bengali writers
Writers from Kolkata
Government College of Art & Craft alumni
Scottish Church Collegiate School alumni
Bengali novelists
City College, Kolkata alumni
People from Mymensingh District
Indian children's writers